Haplogroup K or K-M9 is a human Y-chromosome DNA haplogroup. A sublineage of haplogroup IJK, K-M9, and its descendant clades represent a geographically widespread and diverse haplogroup. The lineages have long been found among males on every continent except Antarctica.

The direct descendants of K-M9 are Haplogroup K2 (formerly KxLT; K-M526) and Haplogroup K1 (L298 = P326, also known as LT).

Origins and distribution
Y-DNA haplogroup K-M9 is an old lineage that arose approximately 47,000-50,000 years ago, probably in South Asia

According to a study by geneticist Spencer Wells, haplogroup K, from which haplogroup P descend, originated in the Middle East or Central Asia. It is likely that haplogroup P diverged somewhere in South Asia into P1, which expanded into Siberia and Northern Eurasia, and into P2, which expanded into Oceania and Southeast Asia.

Basal K* is exceptionally rare and under-researched; while it has been reported at very low frequencies on many continents it is not always clear if the examples concerned have been screened for subclades. Confirmed examples of K-M9* now appear to be most common amongst some populations in Island South East Asia and Melanesia.

Primary descendants of haplogroup LT are L (M20), also known as K1a, and T (M184), also known as K1b.

The descendants of haplogroup K2 include:
 K2a (detected in paleolithic specimens Oase1 and Ust'-Ishim), the subclades of which include the major haplogroups N and O, and; 
 K2b – the ancestor of haplogroups M, P, Q, R, S.

Structure 
Haplogroup K-M9 tree

References

External links 

Spread of Haplogroup K, from National Geographic

K-M9